Fanci's Persuasion is a 1995 American film directed by Charles Herman-Wurmfeld.

External links

1995 films
1995 LGBT-related films
American comedy films
Films directed by Charles Herman-Wurmfeld
1995 directorial debut films
1990s English-language films
1990s American films